Edward Lee Rispone (born January 21, 1949) is an American businessman and politician from the state of Louisiana. He ran as a Republican Party candidate for Governor of Louisiana in the 2019 election, losing to incumbent Democrat John Bel Edwards.

Early life and education
Rispone was raised in Baton Rouge, Louisiana. His father worked as a compressor machinist at an oil refinery owned by Standard Oil, and his mother was a homemaker. He has five brothers and one sister.

Rispone graduated from Redemptorist High School in Baton Rouge. In high school, he played football as a linebacker and offensive guard, and was named to the all-state team in his senior year. He graduated from Louisiana State University, with a concentration in construction technology, in 1972.

Career 
Rispone began working in construction while he was still in school. In 1989, he and his brother Jerry founded ISC Constructors; in 2017 he said that the company had annual revenues of $350 million. In 2000 he criticized a tax increase approved by a state house committee stating that "this has the potential to wipe out all of our profits" due to his business operating on a small profit. In 2003 he was elected the national chairman of the Associated Builders and Contractors. The Louisiana Federation for Children, which advocates for school vouchers, named Rispone as its chairman in 2011. Governor Bobby Jindal appointed him to chair the Louisiana Workforce Investment Council.

In October 2018, Rispone declared his candidacy in the 2019 Louisiana gubernatorial election as a Republican. On October 12, 2019, Rispone finished in second place in the all-candidate election with 27% of the vote, behind incumbent John Bel Edwards, a Democrat, who received 47%, and ahead of Republican congressman Ralph Abraham, who received 24%. Rispone and Edwards advanced to the November 16 runoff election. Edwards defeated Rispone in the runoff election.

Personal life
Rispone and his first wife, Phyllis, were married for 35 years. She died in 2005 of cancer. Rispone married his second wife, Linda, in 2007. He and Linda have seven children and 24 grandchildren as of September 2019.

Electoral history

References

External links

1949 births
20th-century American businesspeople
21st-century American businesspeople
21st-century American politicians
American construction businesspeople
Businesspeople from Louisiana
Candidates in the 2019 United States elections
Living people
Louisiana Republicans
Louisiana State University alumni
People from Baton Rouge, Louisiana